Maria Aaltje ("Marianne") Timmer (born 3 October 1974) is a Dutch former speed skater specializing in the middle distances (1000 and 1500 m). At the 1998 Winter Olympics Timmer won a gold medal in both these events.

Speed skating career 
In 1999 she won the 1000 m in the World Single Distance Championships and in 2004 became world champion in the sprint. In 2006, she won the 1000 m at the 2006 Winter Olympics in Turin. This made her the first skater from the Netherlands to win a gold medal at two different Winter Games.

Timmer broke through at the Junior World Championship in 1994, winning bronze. She began to specialize in the shorter distances.

Nagano 1998 
Timmer won gold in the 1000 and 1500 meter races during the 1998 Winter Olympics in Nagano, beating Chris Witty in the 1000m and Gunda Niemann in the 1500m.

Salt Lake City 2002 
At the 2002 Winter Olympics in Salt Lake City, Timmer finished 8th in the 500m, fourth in the 1000m, and 21st in the 1500m.

World Sprint Speed Skating Championships, Nagano 2004 
On 18 January 2004, Timmer became the first Dutch woman to win a World Sprint Speed Skating Championship. Though she did not win any individual distances (she got three third and one fourth place), the was the most consistent athlete and won the overall championship.

Turin 2006 
At the Dutch championships, Timmer qualified for the 500m and 1000m events at the 2006 Winter Olympics. She was disqualified after a false start in the 500m race, but a week later she surprisingly won gold in the 1000m, beating out favorites Cindy Klassen and Anni Friesinger by a very slim margin. This result qualified her for the 1500m, where she finished 14th.

2008/2009 season
In January 2008, Timmer announced she wished to extend her contract with sponsor DSB Bank, until the 2010 Winter Olympics in Vancouver, and at the end of February 2008 the contract was signed.

2009/2010 season
On 13 November 2009, Timmer broke her heel on the 500m, during a World Cup event in Thialf. She failed to qualify for the Winter Games in Vancouver

2010/2011 season
At the 2011 Dutch Single Distance Championships in Thialf, Timmer got the third-fastest time on the first 500m, but ran into Marrit Leenstra on the second 500m, and fell. The next day, on the 1000m, she did not get farther than tenth place. Because of her first 500m result, she did qualify for the 2010–11 ISU Speed Skating World Cup.

She published a biography in 2010, written by Telegraaf journalist Frank Woestenburg.

She withdrew from the Dutch Sprint Championship on 27 December 2010 after a disappointing 500m on the first day. In May 2010 Timmer, Annette Gerritsen, and Margot Boer left the Control team to start their own team, sponsored by Liga, a company manufacturing biscuits and crackers. She stopped skating on 28 December 2010, though she said she would remain involved with Team Liga. Her official goodbye took place during the Tijdens het 2011 World Sprint Speed Skating Championships in Heerenveen, on 22 January 2011. On that occasion she was named an honorary member of the KNSB.

Records

Personal records

World records

Tournament summary

Personal life 
Timmer was born in Sappemeer. She was previously married to her former coach Peter Mueller. They were married in Las Vegas in 2001, after which he added her to Spaar Select, his skating team, against the wishes of the other skaters, in what a reviewer of his autobiography called a "dominating and intimidating" way. Timmer and Mueller broke up in 2003, and Mueller avenged himself on Timmer in his autobiography. She is married to ex-goalkeeper Henk Timmer. After a fifteen-year relationship and seven years of marriage, the couple split up in 2019.

References

External links
 Marianne Timmer at SkateResults.com
 Photos of Marianne Timmer
 Olympic Medal Winners
 Profile page of Marianne Timmer on Teamliga.nl
 
 

1974 births
Dutch female speed skaters
Speed skaters at the 1998 Winter Olympics
Speed skaters at the 2002 Winter Olympics
Speed skaters at the 2006 Winter Olympics
Olympic speed skaters of the Netherlands
Medalists at the 1998 Winter Olympics
Medalists at the 2006 Winter Olympics
Olympic medalists in speed skating
Olympic gold medalists for the Netherlands
World record setters in speed skating
People from Hoogezand-Sappemeer
Living people
World Single Distances Speed Skating Championships medalists
Dutch speed skating coaches
Dutch sports coaches
20th-century Dutch women
21st-century Dutch women
Sportspeople from Groningen (province)